Eric the Victorious (Old Norse: Eiríkr inn sigrsæli, Modern Swedish: Erik Segersäll; c. 945 – c. 995) was a Swedish monarch as of around 970. Although there were earlier Swedish kings, he is the first Swedish king in a consecutive regnal succession, who is attested in sources independent of each other, and consequently Sweden's list of rulers usually begins with him. His son Olof Skötkonung, however, is considered the first ruler documented to definitely have been accepted both by the original Swedes around Lake Mälaren and by the Geats around Lake Vättern. Adam of Bremen reports a king named Emund Eriksson before Eric, but it is not known whether he was Eric's father.  The Norse sagas' accounts of a Björn Eriksson are considered unreliable. 

Some sources have referred to Eric the Victorious as either King Eric V or Eric VI, modern inventions by counting backwards from Eric XIV (1560–1568), who adopted his numeral according to a 16th-century work on the history of Sweden, Historia de omnibus Gothorum Sueonumque regibus. Whether or not there were any Swedish monarchs named Eric before Eric the Victorious is disputed, with some historians claiming that there were several earlier Erics, and others questioning the reliability of the primary sources used and the existence of these earlier monarchs. The list of monarchs after him is also complicated and sketchy in some early periods, which makes the assignment of any numeral problematic (see Eric and Eric and Erik Årsäll) whether counting backward or forward.

Eric's kingdom

His original territory was in Uppland and neighbouring provinces. He acquired the epithet of Segersäll – Victorious or literally blessed with victory – after defeating an invasion force from the south in the Battle of Fýrisvellir which took place near Uppsala. A brother of Eric's named Olof allegedly being the father of Styrbjörn the Strong, Eric's main opponent in that battle, is part of the traditions about them. 

The extent of Eric's kingdom is unknown. In addition to the Swedish heartland around lake Mälaren it may have extended down along the Baltic Sea as far south as Blekinge. According to Adam of Bremen, he was also King of Denmark after defeating King Sweyn Forkbeard.

According to the Flateyjarbok, his success was largely due to an alliance with free farmers against an earl-class nobility, but archaeological findings suggest that the influence of that class diminished during the last part of the tenth century. Eric probably introduced a system of universal conscription known as ledung in the provinces around Mälaren.

In all probability he also founded the town of Sigtuna, which still exists and where the first Swedish coins were minted for his son and successor King Olof.

Saga sources

Eric the Victorious is named in a number of sagas, Nordic tales of history preserved from oral tradition. In various stories, he is described as the son of a Björn Eriksson and as having ruled together with his brother Olaf. One saga describes his marriage to the infamous Queen Sigrid the Haughty, daughter of a legendary Viking, Skagul Toste, and how in their divorce he gave her all of Gothenland as a fief. According to Eymund's saga he then took a new queen, Aud, daughter of Haakon Sigurdsson, ruler of Norway.

Before that, Eric's brother Olaf died, and a new co-ruler was to be appointed, but the Swedes allegedly refused to accept Eric's rowdy nephew Styrbjörn as such. Eric granted Styrbjörn 60 longships in which he sailed away for a seafaring existence as a Viking. He became the ruler of Jomsborg and an ally of Danish King Harold Bluetooth, whose daughter Tyra he married. Styrbjörn returned to Sweden with an army, although Harold and the Danish troops seem to have turned back. Eric won the Battle of Fýrisvellir, according to Styrbjarnar þáttr Svíakappa, after making sacrifice to Odin and promising that, if victorious, he would give himself to Odin in ten years.

Two skaldic verses by Thorvaldr Hjaltason describe the alleged battle. The first expressly mentions how an Eric has utterly defeated an enemy host at a fortification at Fýrisvellir, while the second specifies that the Vikings were superior in numbers but nevertheless were handily captured when they attacked Sweden, and only those who fled survived. The runestones of Hällestad and Sjörup in Scania, then a part of Denmark, do mention a battle at Uppsala characterized by the defeat and flight of the attackers. These stones have traditionally been associated with the battle, but they also present chronological problems and may be from the next century.

Adam of Bremen

German ecclesiastic chronicler Adam of Bremen (around 1075) provides by far the oldest narrative about King Eric, and it differs substantially from the sagas. As his source he refers to the current King Sweyn II of Denmark whom he interviewed for his chronicle. Adam places Eric's reign after that of a certain Emund Eriksson, without clarifying how they were related. He does not mention the Battle of Fýrisvellir but relates that Eric gathered a large army and invaded Denmark against King Sweyn Forkbeard. The direct reason for the attack is not given, but somehow it concerned an alliance between Eric and "the very powerful king of the Polans, Bolesław (992–1025). He gave Eric his sister or daughter in marriage". That princess has been identified as Gunhild of Wenden, in some Nordic sources the daughter of a king Burislev (Bolesław). According to other interpretations, she was identical with a woman known in later sagas as Sigrid the Haughty, whose name is possibly a misunderstanding of the Old Polish name Świętosława. Eric's invasion of Denmark was successful. Several battles were fought at sea, and there the Danish forces, attacked from the east by Slavs, were annihilated. After his victory, Eric kept Denmark for a time, while Sweyn was forced to flee, first to Norway, then to England, and finally to Scotland whose king received the refugee with kindness.

According to Adam, Eric's rule in Denmark coincided with increased Viking activity in northern Germany. A fleet of Swedish and Danish ships sailed up the Elbe and landed at Stade in Saxony. A Saxon army confronted the invaders but was badly defeated. Several prominent Saxons were captured and brought to the ships, while the Vikings ravaged the province with no resistance. One of the prisoners, a Margrave Siegfried, managed to escape at night with the help of a fisherman. The infuriated Vikings then maimed their remaining prisoners and threw them ashore. However, Siegfried and Duke Benno soon raised a new army and raided the Vikings encamped at Stade. Another Viking detachment was tricked deep into the desolate marsh of Glindesmoor by a captured Saxon knight and annihilated by pursuing Germans.

Adam characterises Eric as a heathen and initially very hostile to the Christian religion.  Nevertheless, a number of missionaries were at work during his reign, foreigners as well as some belonging to recently converted Nordic families. Among them was Odinkar the Elder who preached in Funen, Zealand, Scania and Sweden. Eventually Eric agreed to baptism, presumably while staying in Denmark; and if so he was the first Swedish king to do so.  Due to that significant event, missionaries were allowed to sail over from Denmark to Sweden where they "worked valiantly in the name of the Lord". After some time, Eric is said to have forgotten the Christian faith and reverted to the religion of his ancestors. When Eric died, Sveyn Forkbeard returned from exile and regained Denmark. He also is alleged to have married Eric's widow (whoever she was), mother of Eric's successor King Olof. Thus an alliance between the Swedish and Danish royal houses was created.

Adam's account seems to date the death of Eric the Victorious between 992, when the accession took place in Poland of his ally Boleslaw I (above), and 995, when his son Olof's coinage began in Sigtuna. According to Snorre Sturlasson, Eric died in Uppsala. Discrepancies between Adam's account and other sources have led to a variety of interpretations among Swedish historians, especially about Eric's marriages. The details on his conquest of Denmark have been questioned, since they are not supported in other source material. According to a recent evaluation, however, "that is not unlikely, at least if we consider it a loose suzerainty over powerful Danish lords". At any rate, a comparison between Adam's records and Nordic sagas gives a lasting picture of Eric as a warlike and successful ruler.

Family
Various sources and sagas (see above) list King Eric's wives as Sigrid, Świętosława, Gunhild and Aud, of which two or three may have been the same person but depicted differently and under different names. Such sources have also given Eric a total of four known children:
 Olof Skötkonung d. 1022, Eric's only historically attested child
 Emund, allegedly ruled over part of the realm under his brother Olof
 Holmfrid, sometimes credited as a daughter, not a sister, of Olof and married to Sweyn Haakonsson
 Daughter, married to an Åke and grandmother of Ingvar the Far-Travelled

Eric's nephew Styrbjörn and niece Gyrid were allegedly children of his semi-legendary brother and co-ruler Olof, mentioned in connection with Styrbjörn.

See also
 List of Swedish monarchs
 Adam of Bremen
 Icelandic sagas

Notes

References

External links

 Carl L. Thunberg (2012): Slaget på Fyrisvallarna i ny tolkning (The Battle of Fýrisvellir in a New Interpretation)

940s births
990s deaths
Year of birth uncertain
Year of death uncertain
10th-century Swedish monarchs
House of Munsö